From March 9 to June 5, 1920, voters of the Democratic Party elected delegates to the 1920 Democratic National Convention, for the purposing of choosing a nominee for president in the 1920 United States presidential election. 

The race for delegates was made under a cloud of uncertainty because the party's two leading names, President Woodrow Wilson and three-time nominee William Jennings Bryan, withheld their intentions; both men privately hoped for the nomination, but neither's name was formally submitted before the voters or the convention as a candidate.

The delegate elections were inconclusive, with Attorney General A. Mitchell Palmer, Treasury Secretary William Gibbs McAdoo, and Ohio governor James A. Cox leading the candidate field. With no clear front-runner, many states withheld their delegates from any one candidate, instead sending an uncommitted slate of delegates or preferring to back a favorite son on the first ballot. At the convention, Cox was ultimately nominated on the forty-fourth ballot.

Candidates
Governor James M. Cox of Ohio
Former Ambassador to Germany James Watson Gerard of New York
Governor Edward I. Edwards of New Jersey
Attorney General of the U.S. A. Mitchell Palmer from Pennsylvania
Former U.S. Secretary of the Treasury William Gibbs McAdoo from California
Senator Robert Latham Owen of Oklahoma

Not placed in nomination
Former United States Secretary of State William Jennings Bryan of Nebraska
House Minority Leader Champ Clark of Missouri
President of the United States Woodrow Wilson of New Jersey

Favorite sons
U.S. Secretary of Agriculture Edwin T. Meredith of Iowa
Senator Carter Glass of Virginia
Governor Al Smith of New York
Senator Gilbert Hitchcock of Nebraska
Ambassador to the United Kingdom John W. Davis of West Virginia
Senator John Sharp Williams of Mississippi
Party Chairman Homer Stille Cummings of Connecticut
Senator Furnifold Simmons of North Carolina
Senator Thomas R. Marshall of Indiana

Primary and caucus results

See also
Republican Party presidential primaries, 1920
White primary

Notes

References